Half the Perfect World is the fourth studio album by American jazz singer Madeleine Peyroux. It was released on September 12, 2006. It peaked at No. 33 on the Billboard 200 albums chart and had sold 218,000 copies in the United States by December 2008.

The album contains four original songs, all of them co-written by Peyroux, and cover versions of songs by Johnny Mercer, Joni Mitchell, Tom Waits, Charlie Chaplin, Serge Gainsbourg, and Leonard Cohen. "I'm All Right," "A Little Bit" and "Once in a While" were released as singles.

David Dye listed the album at number 10 on World Cafe's list of the top 10 CDs of 2006.

Track listing
 "I'm All Right" (Walter Becker, Peyroux, Larry Klein) – 3:27
 "The Summer Wind" (Hans Bradtke, Henry Mayer, Johnny Mercer) – 3:55
 "Blue Alert" (Leonard Cohen, Anjani Thomas) – 4:10
 "Everybody's Talkin'" (Fred Neil) – 5:10
 "River" featuring k.d. lang (Joni Mitchell) – 5:19
 "A Little Bit" (Jesse Harris, Klein, Peyroux) – 4:02
 "Once in a While" (Harris, Klein, Peyroux) – 4:00
 "(Looking for) The Heart of Saturday Night" (Tom Waits) – 3:27
 "Half the Perfect World" (Cohen, Thomas) – 4:21
 "La Javanaise" (Serge Gainsbourg) – 4:11
 "California Rain" (Harris, Klein, Peyroux) – 2:57
 "Smile" (Charlie Chaplin, Geoffrey Parsons, John Turner) – 3:57

Personnel
 Madeleine Peyroux – vocals, acoustic guitar (tracks 1, 3, 6–8, 10, 11)
 Sam Yahel – piano (tracks 2, 4, 5, 7, 9, 10, 12), Wurlitzer electric piano (1, 3, 6, 8, 11), Hammond organ (1, 3, 6), Estey organ (7, 9, 10, 12)
 Larry Goldings – celeste (tracks 3, 10)
 Till Brönner – trumpet (tracks 8, 12)
 Gary Foster – alto saxophone (tracks 2, 9)
 Dean Parks – guitars (exc. track 3; solos on 1, 6), ukulele (1, 11, 12)
 Greg Leisz – pedal steel guitar (tracks 8, 11)
 David Piltch – double bass
 Scott Amendola – drums (tracks 2, 5, 9, 12)
 Jay Bellerose – drums (exc. 2, 5, 9, 12), additional cymbals (2, 9)
 String quartet arranged by Mark Orton (tracks 7, 10)
 Carla Kihlstedt – violin
 Graeme Jennings – violin
 Charith Premawardhana – viola
 Sam Bass – cello

Charts

Certifications

References

2006 albums
Madeleine Peyroux albums
Albums produced by Larry Klein
Rounder Records albums